Ninety Minutes (Spanish: Noventa minutos) is a 1949 Spanish drama film directed by Antonio del Amo and starring Nani Fernández and Enrique Guitart.

The film's art direction was by Sigfrido Burmann.

Synopsis 
A group of neighbors with different ideas and circumstances, along with a policeman and a thief, hide in a bomb shelter during a German aerial bombardment of London. Once the attack is over, they discover that they cannot get out of there, because the entrance door is jammed by the rubble.  It is from there that they discover that they can die asphyxiated within a maximum period of ninety minutes, which will change the lives of all of them and will make the true identity of each one emerge.

Cast
 Julia Caba Alba  as Sra. Winter  
 Fernando Fernán Gómez  as Sr. Marchand  
 Nani Fernández  as Doctora Suárez  
 Enrique Guitart  as Richard  
 José Jaspe  as Sr. Dupont  
 José María Lado  as Preston  
 Mary Lamar as Sra. Dupont  
 Gina Montes as Clara Marchand  
 Lolita Moreno as Helen Winter  
 Carlos Muñoz as John  
 Jacinto San Emeterio  as Albert

References

Bibliography 
 de España, Rafael. Directory of Spanish and Portuguese film-makers and films. Greenwood Press, 1994.

External links 
 

1949 drama films
Spanish drama films
1949 films
1940s Spanish-language films
Films directed by Antonio del Amo
Films scored by Jesús García Leoz
Spanish black-and-white films
1940s Spanish films